In the 1830s, in addition to the newspaper The Liberator, the Boston-based abolitionists William Garrison and Isaac Knapp printed and/or published a number of anti-slavery pamphlets and books. The statements "printed by" and "published by" are in most cases taken from the books or pamphlets themselves. For the others, in which information is taken from library catalogs, a link to the catalog entry is provided.

1831

1832

1833

1834

1835

1836

1837

1838

1839

1841

References

Abolitionism in the United States
American book publishers (people)
American printers
Abolitionists from Boston
19th century in Boston
Lists of books by imprint or publisher
Lists of American books